Richard Furman Reeves (November 28, 1936 – March 25, 2020) was an American writer, syndicated columnist, and lecturer at the Annenberg School for Communication at the University of Southern California in Los Angeles.

Life and career
Reeves was born in 1936 in New York City, the son of Dorothy (Forshay), an actress, and Furman W. Reeves, a judge in Hudson County, New Jersey. He received his Mechanical Engineering degree from Stevens Institute of Technology in 1960. After graduation, he spent a year working as an engineer for Ingersoll-Rand, after which he moved to journalism. From 1961–1965, Reeves co-founded and worked for the Phillipsburg Free Press (New Jersey), then worked for Newark Evening News and the New York Herald Tribune before being assigned the post of Chief Political Correspondent for The New York Times in 1966.  In 1971, Reeves left the Times to lecture at Hunter College.

The opinions of Reeves generally had a liberal bent—he opposed the war to topple Saddam Hussein as "stupid and unnecessary" (column, March 19, 2003)—but shunned "extreme" leftist positions. He paid close attention to happenings overseas and often filled his columns with explanations of current trends based on history. Many of his columns focused on the world's reaction to political actions of the United States.

He also published nine books, mostly about American politics.  In 1993, he appeared in the film Dave, one of several journalists who played themselves in the film.

Reeves' weekly column, carried by Universal Press Syndicate, appeared in more than 160 newspapers across the United States after 1979. He also wrote a monthly column from Paris in Travel and Leisure magazine.

He was married to Catherine O'Neill, founder of the Women's Commission for Women and Children Refugees. Together they had five children and divided their time between Los Angeles and New York City.

In October 2004 in an article entitled "To begin with, the President is a fool", he shared his belief that John Kerry would win the 2004 presidential election. In the article, Reeves indicated that he voted absentee for the Democrat. He then shared his bias by saying: "Biased? Of course. That's why I write this column: to share my bias. I am always amazed when I get letters, many of them, accusing me of being a 'liberal' or, a lot worse, an 'elitist.' Yes, I am. Hello!"

In November 2005, Reeves theorized that George W. Bush could be regarded as the worst president in U.S. history, noting: "The History News Network at George Mason University has just polled historians informally on the Bush record. Four hundred and fifteen, about a third of those contacted, answered, making the project as unofficial as it was interesting. These were the results: 338 said they believed Bush was failing, while 77 said he was succeeding. Fifty said they thought he was the worst president ever."

Reeves died on March 25, 2020, in Los Angeles from cardiac arrest.

Bibliography 
A Ford, Not a Lincoln, Harcourt Brace, 1975, 
Old Faces of 1976, Harper and Row, 1976, 
Convention, Harcourt Trade Publishers, 1977, 
American Journey: Traveling with Tocqueville in Search of Democracy in America, Simon & Schuster, 1982, 
Jet Lag: The Running Commentary of a Bicoastal Reporter, Andrews McMeel Publishing, LLC, 1982, 
Passage to Peshawar: Pakistan: Between the Hindu Kush and the Arabian Sea, Simon & Schuster, 1983, 
The Reagan Detour, Simon & Schuster, 1984, 
President Kennedy: Profile of Power, Simon & Schuster, 1993, 
Running in Place: How Bill Clinton Disappointed America, Andrews McMeel Publishing, LLC, 1996, 
Family Travels -- Around the World in 30 (Or So) Days, Andrews McMeel Publishing, LLC, 1997, 
Do the Media Govern?, SAGE Publications, 1997, (with Shanto Iyengar)
What The People Know: Freedom and the Press, Harvard University Press, 1998, 
President Nixon: Alone in the White House, Simon & Schuster, 2001, 
President Reagan: The Triumph of Imagination, Simon & Schuster, 2005, 
, about New Zealand born physicist Ernest Rutherford
Daring Young Men: The Heroism and Triumph of The Berlin Airlift - June 1948-May 1949, Simon & Schuster, 2010, 
Infamy: The Shocking Story of the Japanese-American Internment in World War II, Henry Holt and Co., 2015,

Awards 
1978: Silver Gavel, American Bar Association
1980: Emmy, for Lights, Camera, Politics!, ABC News 
1982: Christopher Award
1983: Book of the Year, Christophers
1983: Columbia-Dupont Award, for Struggle for Birmingham, PBS
1984: George Foster Peabody Award, for Red Star over Khyber, PBS
1984: Peabody Award, Columbia University
1993: Book of the Year, Washington Monthly
1993: Non-Fiction Book of the Year, PEN
1997: Goldman Lecturer on American Civilization and Government, Library of Congress
1998: Carey McWilliams Award (distinguished contributions to the understanding of American politics), American Political Science Association
1998: Lifetime Achievement Award, National Society of Newspaper Columnists
Literary Lion, New York Public Library

Honorary degrees 
 Stevens Institute of Technology
 Drew University
 St. Joseph's College

References

External links 
 John F Kennedy Presidential Library and Museum

Booknotes interview with Reeves on President Kennedy: Profile of Power, December 12, 1993.

1936 births
2020 deaths
Writers from New York City
American political writers
American male non-fiction writers
American columnists
Stevens Institute of Technology alumni
American biographers
Hunter College faculty